Jalea was one of seven s built for the  (Royal Italian Navy) during the early 1930s. She played a minor role in the Spanish Civil War of 1936–1939 supporting the Spanish Nationalists.

Design and description
The Argonauta class was derived from the earlier s. They displaced  surfaced and  submerged. Their crew numbered 44 officers and enlisted men.

For surface running, the boats were powered by two  diesel engines, each driving one propeller shaft. When submerged each propeller was driven by a  electric motor. They could reach  on the surface and  underwater.

The boats were armed with six  torpedo tubes, four in the bow and two in the stern for which they carried a total of 12 torpedoes. They were also armed with a single  deck gun forward of the conning tower for combat on the surface. Their anti-aircraft armament consisted of two single  machine guns.

Construction and career
Jalea was laid down by Odero-Terni-Orlando at their Muggiano shipyard in 1930, launched on 15 June 1932 and completed the following year. Both torpedoes missed and one of them beached itself without exploding. It was identified as Italian built and proved that Italy was covertly supporting the Nationalists. One torpedo destroyed one of the former's boiler rooms, killing four men and wounding eight and crippling the ship. Jalea accidentally surfaced while attacked which allowed observers to determine that she was of foreign origin, not a boat in Nationalist service.

Notes

References

External links
 Sommergibili Marina Militare website

Argonauta-class submarines
World War II submarines of Italy
1932 ships
Ships built in La Spezia
Ships built by OTO Melara